The Daisy Model 25 is a BB gun, modeled after a pump action shotgun with a trombone pump action mechanism.  The Model 25 dominated the low price, higher performance airgun market for over 50 years (1914–1978) before discontinuation.  They re-entered production in 2009.

The Model 25 was designed by Charles F. Lefever. By some accounts, 15 million pieces were sold by 1957 and 20 million by 1980. Other estimates are "over 8 million".

The Daisy Model 25 pump-action BB gun typically achieved . However, the 25's capacity was only 50 BBs, in comparison to the 1000 BB capacity of some leverguns. The 25 does have an advantage in ammunition feeding, however, in that its feeding is spring-loaded, as opposed to many gravity-fed guns which require a shift in gun angle to reload a BB.

The re-issued version is made in China and has a muzzle velocity of approx .

References 

Air guns of the United States